The 1946–47 Serie C was the ninth edition of Serie C, the third highest league in the Italian football league system.

Legend

Northern Italy
Northern Italy sides were divided in nine rounds (gironi). The winners qualified to a tournament to determine the three teams promoted to 1947–48 Serie B.

Girone A
Liguria

Girone B
Piedmont

Girone C
Western Lombardy

Girone D
Eastern Piedmont, southern Lombardy and Emilia

Girone E
Northern Lombardy

Girone F
Eastern Lombardy

Girone G
Western Veneto and Trentino-Alto Adige/Südtirol

Girone H
Eastern Veneto

Girone I
Friuli-Venezia Giulia

Finals

Girone A

Girone B

Girone C

Bolzano, Meganta and Vita Nova promoted to 1947–48 Serie B.

Central Italy
Central Italy sides were divided in six rounds (gironi). The winners qualified to a tournament to determine the two teams promoted to 1947–48 Serie B.

Girone A
Emilia

Girone B
Umbria, Marche and Romagna

Girone C
Northern Tuscany

Girone D
Southern Tuscany

Girone E
Lazio and Umbria

Girone F
Abruzzo and Marche

Final round

Southern Italy
Southern Italy sides were divided in three rounds (gironi). The winners and the runners-up qualified to a tournament to determine the sole team promoted to 1947–48 Serie B.

Girone A
Campania

Girone B
Apulia and Campania

Girone C
Calabria and Sicily

Final round

Serie C seasons
3
Italy